Raw Bud is a Welsh project made up of three former members of Dub War (Raw Bud spelled backwards) and Skindred. Their only release to date is on the Bristol-based Runnin Riot label, "Rise Up". An album with a working title of 'Urban Metal' was due for release around October 2005, but never appeared.

Members
 Jeff Rose - Guitar
 Richie Glover - Bass guitar
 Martin "Ginge" Ford - drums

Discography

Singles

"Rise Up" is an anti-mix (opposite of a remix) of one of Roni Size's recent songs. At first it was only available as a bootleg on a limited 7", but had an official release on CD / 7" & 12". Featuring on the track is the British reggae artist Sweetie Irie. He also featured with the rest of the band in the promotional music video.

References

External links
 Dub War
 Biography of Dub War Including a mention of Raw Bud.

Welsh heavy metal musical groups
People from Newport, Wales
British musical trios
Reggae metal musical groups